Owen John "Terry" Scott (4 May 1927 – 26 July 1994) was an English actor and comedian who appeared in seven of the Carry On films. He is also best known for appearing in the BBC1 sitcom Terry and June with June Whitfield.

Early life
Scott was born and brought up in Watford, Hertfordshire and educated at Watford Field Junior School and Watford Grammar School for Boys. He was the youngest of three children, and the only surviving son after his brother Aubrey died when Scott was six. After National Service in the Navy at the end of World War II, he briefly studied accounting.

Career
Scott began his acting career with appearances on radio shows such as Workers Playtime, which were followed by appearances on television. He gained an opportunity to perform in farce when he joined the Whitehall Theatre Company. With Bill Maynard he appeared at Butlin's Holiday Camp in Skegness, Lincolnshire and partnered him in the TV series Great Scott - It's Maynard!. During the 1960s, he appeared alongside Hugh Lloyd in Hugh and I (1962–1967). They both appeared as Ugly Sisters in pantomime at The London Palladium and Scott reappeared in the same role with Julian Orchard in later years. Scott later appeared with Lloyd in Hugh and I Spy (1968) and in the 1969 sitcom The Gnomes of Dulwich (1969) as gnomes.

Scott's novelty record "My Brother" (written by Mitch Murray, released in 1962 on Parlophone) was based on a schoolboy character (he dressed in the uniform to sing it on TV). In the 1970s, he had a role in TV commercials for Curly Wurly caramel bars, in which he again appeared dressed as a schoolboy, with short trousers and cap. He repeated this performance several times on BBC TVs long-running variety show The Good Old Days. Scott had played a small role in the very first of the Carry On films series of films, Carry On Sergeant in 1958. In 1968 he returned to the series with a role in Carry On Up the Khyber (1968), playing main roles in six of the later films.

He starred alongside June Whitfield in several series of the comedy Happy Ever After and its successor, Terry and June. They had first worked together making a series of the sketch show Scott On (1968). They also featured in supporting roles together in the film version of Bless This House. Although both Scott and Whitfield both made several Carry On appearances, they never appeared in the same film. From 1981 to 1992, Scott was the voice of Penfold the hamster in the animated series Danger Mouse.

Personal life and death
He suffered from ill health for several years in the latter part of his life. In 1979, he had a life-saving operation after a brain haemorrhage. He also suffered from creeping paralysis and had to wear a neck brace.

Scott was also diagnosed with cancer in 1987.  He died from its effects at his family home in Witley, Surrey, on 26 July 1994, at the age of 67. He said of his last illness: "I know it would be better to give up the booze, fags and birds, but life would be so boring, wouldn't it?"

When Terry and June ended in 1987, he suffered a nervous breakdown. The breakdown was in part brought on by his public confession that he had indulged in a series of affairs since his marriage to dancer Margaret Peden in 1957. The couple had four daughters: Sarah, Nicola, Lindsay and Ally.

Filmography

Discography
Don't Light The Fire 'Til After Santa's Gone/My Brother, Parlophone R 4967 (December 1962)

References

External links
 

1927 births
1994 deaths
Butlins Redcoats
Deaths from cancer in England
English male film actors
English male comedians
English male television actors
English male voice actors
People educated at Watford Grammar School for Boys
People from Watford
Male actors from Hertfordshire
20th-century English male actors
20th-century English comedians
British male comedy actors
British novelty song performers
Royal Navy personnel of World War II